This is a list of Telugu films in the year 1978.

References

External links
 * Vayasu Pilichindi at IMDb.

1978
Telugu
Telugu films